State Route 273 (SR 273) is a state highway in Apache County, Arizona that runs from its junction with SR 260 west of Eagar to its junction with SR 261 north of Big Lake.  It winds through the forest but is overall a north–south route.

Route description

The northern terminus of SR 273 is located at SR 260 within the Fort Apache Indian Reservation. SR 273 was designated in 1955 from SR 73 (this section now part of SR 260) southeast and northeast to SR 73, with a spur southeast. On August 16, 1991, the section from the spur northeast was renumbered as SR 261. SR 273 was rerouted over SR 273 spur, eliminating the duplication of mileposts. It heads southeast from this intersection and passes along the east side of Sunrise Lake. The highway curves towards the east to the south of Sunrise Lake as it heads towards White Mountain Reservoir. The highway leaves the Indian Reservation as it approaches the reservoir.  It curves towards the southeast as it passes the reservoir. It curves towards the south as it intersects National Forest Service Road 87. The highway continues towards the south before curving back towards the east to a junction with SR 261. The highway curves back towards the south at this intersection. It continues south to its southern terminus at Big Lake.

SR 273 travels through sparsely populated areas and does not pass through any cities or towns.  It serves primarily as an access road to the Sunrise Ski Resort, one of the few ski resorts in Arizona, as well as general access to the White Mountains. It also provides access to Big Lake. The segment between Sunrise and SR 261 was formerly an unpaved gravel road.

Junction list

References

273
Transportation in Apache County, Arizona
White Mountains (Arizona)